Carl K. McKinley (October 9, 1895 – July 24, 1966) was an American composer of classical music. Born in Yarmouth, Maine, he spent some time in Paris on a Guggenheim Fellowship. He studied music at Harvard University, and was granted a Naumberg Fellowship to study in New York City for the 1917-1918 school year. There he worked with Rubin Goldmark, Gaston Dethier, and Walter Henry Rothwell. He later played the organ in a church in Hartford, Connecticut, after which he spent four years playing the instrument in New York's Capitol Theatre. In 1929 he became a member of the faculty of the New England Conservatory of Music. His students there included Ivana Marburger Themmen.

McKinley wrote mainly for orchestra, and had pieces performed by the Philadelphia Orchestra and the New York Philharmonic. He also composed for organ, for chorus, and for piano, and wrote a handful of songs. He has been described as a "conservative modernist" who acknowledged that his own style borrows something from Richard Wagner.

He died in Centerville, Massachusetts, in 1966, aged 71.

References

1895 births
1966 deaths
American male composers
American organists
American male organists
Harvard University alumni
New England Conservatory faculty
20th-century American composers
People from Yarmouth, Maine
20th-century organists
20th-century American male musicians